The 2001 Winton V8 Supercar round was the tenth round of the 2001 Shell Championship Series. It was held on the weekend of 8 to 9 September at the Winton Motor Raceway in Benalla, Victoria.

Race report 

Russell Ingall took his first round win of the season, which would further help his efforts to win the championship. 

The first race was cut short by a few laps after the race was red flagged due to several incidents that warranted the race to be stopped, thereby making Greg Murphy the winner.

Race results

Qualifying

Top Ten Shootout

Race 1

Race 2

Championship standings

References

External links 

Winton